Elisabeth Christine of Brunswick-Wolfenbüttel (28 August 1691 – 21 December 1750) was Princess of Brunswick-Wolfenbüttel, Holy Roman Empress, German Queen, Queen of Bohemia and Hungary; and Archduchess of Austria by her marriage to Emperor Charles VI. She was renowned for her delicate beauty and also for being the mother of Empress Maria Theresa. She was the longest serving Holy Roman Empress.

Biography
Elisabeth Christine was born on 28 August 1691 in Brunswick, then located in the Duchy of Brunswick-Lüneburg. She was the first child and eldest daughter of Louis Rudolph, Duke of Brunswick-Wolfenbüttel, and his wife, Princess Christine Louise of Oettingen-Oettingen. She had three siblings: Charlotte August (born and died 1692), Charlotte Christine (born 1694), and Antoinette Amalie (born 1696).

At age 13 Elisabeth Christine became engaged to the future Charles VI, Holy Roman Emperor, through negotiations between her ambitious grandfather, Anthony Ulrich, Duke of Brunswick-Wolfenbüttel and Charles' sister-in-law, Empress Wilhelmine Amalia, whose father was John Frederick, Duke of Brunswick-Calenberg and thus belonged to another branch of the House of Welf. However, the Lutheran Protestant bride opposed the marriage at first, since it involved her converting to Roman Catholicism, but finally she gave in. She was tutored in Catholicism by her mother-in-law, Empress Eleonore, who introduced her to the religion  and made a pilgrimage with her to Mariazell in 1706. On 1 May 1707, she was converted in Bamberg, Germany. She was required to swear the Tridentine Creed rather than a modified version she had hoped. Prior to the wedding, she was required to undergo a medical examination to prove her fertility by a doctor and the Jesuit confessor of Charles.

Spain

At the time of the wedding, Charles was fighting for his claim to the Spanish throne against the French candidate Philip, so he was living in Barcelona. Elisabeth Christine arrived in Spain in July 1708 and married Charles on 1 August 1708 in the church of Santa María del Mar, Barcelona. As Philip had already fathered a son, Elisabeth Christine was immediately pressured to produce a son. During her time in Spain, she had a long-term correspondence with her mother, which was reportedly a consolation for the continuous pressure to produce a son.

In 1711, Charles left for Vienna to succeed as Emperor. He left Elisabeth Christine behind in Spain, appointing her as General Governor of Catalonia in his absence. She ruled Catalonia alone until 1713, when the war ended with Philip recognized by all of Austria's allies. Her official role as regent had been to sustain the morale of Charles's Catalan subjects, but Martino claimed that she actually governed more effectively than Charles had during his Spanish reign. She then joined her husband in Austria.

Austria

As empress, Elisabeth Christine as well as her predecessor were described as accomplished in music, discretion, modesty and diligence, and was regarded to fulfill her representational role as empress well both within the Spanish court protocol of hunting and balls and amateur theater as well as the religious devotion days of pietas austriaca. She was an excellent shot and attended shooting matches, participated in hunting while she and her ladies-in-waiting dressed in amazon attire and also played billiards. Elisabeth Christine was later rumored to be a crypto-Protestant, likely because she was a patron of Jansenists such as Johann Christoph von Bartenstein.

Charles VI did not allow her any political influence whatsoever after her arrival in Austria in 1713. However, she was described as intelligent and self-sufficient, and she established political connections among the ministers, especially Starhemberg; and she took some initiative to engage in politics on her own. In the 1720s, she appeared to have had some influence in the treaty with the Russian Tsar through her family connections in Northern Germany, and she allied herself with the court faction which opposed the plans to marry her daughters to members of the Spanish royal house.

The marriage of Elisabeth Christine was dominated by the pressure upon her to give birth to a male heir. This she later fulfilled when she gave birth to a male heir named Archduke Leopold John in 1716. However, at age 7 months the infant Leopold died.  She reportedly found the situation very stressing and was tormented by the loss of confidence in Charles VI that this caused.  Three years after her marriage, court doctors prescribed large doses of liquor to make her more fertile, which gave her face a permanent blush. During her 1725 pregnancy, Charles unsuccessfully had her bedchamber decorated with erotic images of male beauty so as to make her expected baby male by stimulating her fantasy. After this, the court doctors prescribed a rich diet to increase her fertility, which made her so fat that she became unable to walk, experienced breathing problems, insomnia and dropsy and had to be lowered into her chairs by a specially constructed machine.

Though her health was devastated by the different prescriptions as how to make her conceive another son, Charles VI apparently did care for her: he continued to refer to her by her pet name White Liz, expressed sincere concern in his diary about her health and left her an independent income in his will. Charles had a mistress before the marriage, and he had a mistress, countess Althann, from 1711 onward, though Althann was not an official mistress and had been married to one of his ministers shortly before the arrival of the empress to make the relationship more discreet.

Elisabeth Christine got along very well with her mother-in-law, Eleonore, and her sister-in-law Wilhelmine Amalia, and the three empresses were described as supportive toward each other: Wilhelmine Amalia nursed Elisabeth Christine when she had smallpox, and Elisabeth Christine nursed Eleonore during her last illness.

Empress Dowager
In 1740, Charles VI died, leaving her a widow. As a widow, she never received the large income left to her in the will of Charles because of the crisis of the state, but her daughter Maria Theresa provided a comfortable existence for her court. Though the traditional view has been that she had a good relationship with her daughter the empress, there is actually nothing to confirm such a thing. While Maria Theresa is known to have freely expressed her affection for people she cared for, she never did so with her mother; she visited her regularly, but the visits were formal, and during her interaction she behaved strictly according to Spanish court etiquette. In 1747, the Prussian ambassador claimed that she was politically active, "without arousing the suspicion that she is trying to meddle" in political matters. Elisabeth Christine died in Vienna.

Children
Leopold Johann (13 April 1716 – 4 November 1716), died in childhood.
Maria Theresa (13 May 1717 – 29 November 1780), Holy Roman Empress, ruler of the Habsburg domains
Maria Anna (26 September 1718 – 16 December 1744), governor of the Austrian Netherlands for a few months before her death in childbirth
Maria Amalia (5 April 1724 – 19 April 1730), died in childhood.

Ancestry

See also
 Order of Elizabeth and Theresa

References

Sources

Royal titles 

|-

|-

|-

|-

|-

1691 births
1750 deaths
17th-century German people
18th-century German people
Nobility from Braunschweig
Holy Roman Empresses
German queens consort
Hungarian queens consort
German Roman Catholics
Burials at the Imperial Crypt
Burials at St. Stephen's Cathedral, Vienna
Royal consorts of Naples
Royal consorts of Sicily
Bohemian queens consort
Austrian royal consorts
Converts to Roman Catholicism from Lutheranism
New House of Brunswick
17th-century German women
18th-century Austrian women
18th-century women of the Holy Roman Empire
Queen mothers
Daughters of monarchs